Gauri Shankar Chaudhary is a Nepalese Politician, former agriculture minister and    Minister of Labour, Employment and Social Security  and  the Member Of House Of Representatives (Nepal) elected from Kailali-3, Province No. 7. He is member of the Communist Party of Nepal (Unified Marxist–Leninist).

See also 

 2021 split in Communist Party of Nepal (Maoist Centre)

References

Living people
Year of birth missing (living people)
Nepal MPs 2017–2022
Nepal Communist Party (NCP) politicians
Members of the 2nd Nepalese Constituent Assembly
Communist Party of Nepal (Unified Marxist–Leninist) politicians
Communist Party of Nepal (Maoist Centre) politicians